The men's 500 m sprint competition in road speed skating at the 2017 World Games took place on 25 July 2017 at the Millennium Park in Wrocław, Poland.

Competition format
A total of 34 athletes entered the competition. In each round 2 best skaters qualify to the next round.

Results

Preliminaries

Heat 1

Heat 3

Heat 5

Heat 7

Heat 2

Heat 4

Heat 6

Heat 8

Quarterfinals

Heat 1

Heat 3

Heat 2

Heat 4

Semifinals

Heat 1

Heat 2

Final

References 

Road speed skating at the 2017 World Games
2017 World Games